The Kontek HVDC is a  long, monopolar 400 kV high-voltage direct current cable between Germany and the Danish island Zealand.  Its name comes from "continent" and the name of the former Danish power transmission company "Elkraft", which operated the power grid on the Danish islands Lolland, Falster and Zealand and had the abbreviation "ek". As of today, the cable is operated by Energinet.dk in Denmark and 50Hertz Transmission GmbH in Germany.

Kontek is remarkable because, in contrast to similar facilities like Baltic Cable and Konti-Skan, all land sections of the  onshore lines on Falster, Zealand and Germany are implemented as underground cable. This unusual measure, which raised the construction costs of Kontek significantly, was made for practical rather than technical reasons. Obtaining permission for building overhead lines can take a long time, and hence underground cables were used in order to ensure it was completed on schedule.

Description
The Kontek cable begins in the static inverter plant of Bentwisch in Germany. It runs  to Markgrafenheide on the Baltic Sea, where a  submarine cable section to the island of Falster begins. In this section, the Kontek crosses the Baltic Cable at  through the use of a  ramp. The Kontek reaches Falster near Gedser, and crosses the island via  of underground cable. Subsequently, a  submarine cable section then crosses the sea between Falster and Zealand. A  land cable on Zealand follows, which ends at the static inverter station in Bjæverskov.

The Kontek capacity is 600 megawatts and was commissioned in 1995.

The high-voltage cable of the Kontek is implemented as paper-isolated oil-filled cable with two copper conductors with a cross section of 800 mm2 permanently joined in parallel. For better monitoring of the oil, the land sections of the Kontek cable are divided in sections of approx. , which are separated by oil-impermeable sockets from each other. In the proximity of these sockets - at some distance from the cable route - there are automatic stations for the monitoring of the oil pressure, the oil temperature and other operating parameters of the cable. As electrode cables of the Kontek, on the German and on the Danish side, commercial plastic-isolated 17 kV-cables are used.

The static inverter station in Bjæverskov was attached to an existing substation for 380 kV/110 kV. For the construction of the static inverter plant in Bentwisch a new construction site was chosen even though only one kilometer north there is still the old 220 kV/110 kV-substation which was built in the GDR. In 2002 the static inverter station in Bentwisch was extended to a 380 kV/110 kV-substation and connected by a 110 kV-line to the old 220 kV/110 kV-substation.

A supplemental 400 MW AC connection between Germany and Zealand in 2018 and costing DKK 2.9 billion, is planned to use the Kriegers Flak offshore wind farm, enabling the wind power to be transmitted to either country as well as passing power between the countries.

Sites

References

External links 

 Kontek HVDC Interconnection (ABB)
 Google Maps: Bentwisch Converter
 Google Maps: Bjæverskov Converter

Electrical interconnectors to and from the Nordic grid
Electrical interconnectors to and from the Synchronous Grid of Continental Europe
Submarine power cables
HVDC transmission lines
Electric power infrastructure in Denmark
Electric power transmission systems in Germany
Connections across the Baltic Sea
Denmark–Germany relations
Energy infrastructure completed in 1995
1995 establishments in Denmark
1995 establishments in Germany